Miguel Torres de Andrade (November 1926 – December 31, 1962) was an internationally known Brazilian writer and actor.

Andrade was born in Curaçá, Bahia.  Some of his movies were nominees for Oscars.  He died, aged 36, in Cajazeiras, Paraíba.

Filmography as writer
Os Fuzis (1964)... aka The Guns
Sol Sobre a Lama (1963)
Vencidos, Os (1963) (story)
Três Cabras de Lampião (1962)... aka Three Henchmen of Lampião
Os Cafajestes (1962)... aka The Unscrupulous Ones
Pupilas do Senhor Reitor, As (1961)

External links

1926 births
1962 deaths
Brazilian male writers
Brazilian artists
People from Bahia